Burayevsky District (Boray rayonı) is an administrative and municipal district (raion), one of the fifty-four in the Republic of Bashkortostan, Russia. It is located in the north of the republic and borders with Yanaulsky and Tatyshlinsky Districts in the north, Baltachevsky District in the east, Mishkinsky District in the southeast, Birsky District in the south, Dyurtyulinsky District in the south and southwest, and with Kaltasinsky District in the west. Its administrative center is the rural locality (a selo) of Burayevo. As of the 2010 Census, the total population of the district was 25,154, with the population of Burayevo accounting for 37.9% of that number.

History
The district was established in 1930.

Administrative and municipal status
Within the framework of administrative divisions, Burayevsky District is one of the fifty-four in the Republic of Bashkortostan. The district is divided into thirteen selsoviets, comprising ninety-five rural localities. As a municipal division, the district is incorporated as Burayevsky Municipal District. Its thirteen selsoviets are incorporated as thirteen rural settlements within the municipal district. The selo of Burayevo serves as the administrative center of both the administrative and municipal district.

References

Notes

Sources

Districts of Bashkortostan
States and territories established in 1930